1989 Panasonic Cup is the name of two Australian sporting competitions:
1989 Panasonic Cup (Australian rules football)
1989 Panasonic Cup (rugby league)